Mark Miskimmin is a Northern Irish footballer who plays for Carrick Rangers.

Club career

Linfield
His first Linfield goals came as substitute against Institute at Windsor Park on 29 August 2008. He gained the reputation of supersub as he came off the bench a number of times and scored winning goals.

Glenavon
Miskimmin left Linfield in 2010 to sign for Glenavon where he played over 60 league matches in his two years at the club.

Donegal Celtic
He subsequently joined Donegal Celtic in 2012; the club were relegated at the end of his first full season.

Glentoran
On 2 June 2013 Miskimmin signed for East Belfast side Glentoran as a replacement for Andrew Waterworth and went on to make 25 league appearances for the club.

Coleraine
In the summer of 2014 Miskimmin left Glentoran, who had a mass exodus of players leave due to the uncertain future of the club. He joined Coleraine where he spent one season making 24 appearances, scoring nine goals in the league in one season at the club before moving on.

Carrick Rangers
In July 2015 Miskimmin signed for Carrick Rangers who were newly promoted to the NIFL Premiership.

References

1988 births
Association footballers from Northern Ireland
Donegal Celtic F.C. players
Glenavon F.C. players
Glentoran F.C. players
Linfield F.C. players
Living people
Association football forwards
Carrick Rangers F.C. players